L. salicifolia may refer to:
 Licania salicifolia, a plant species endemic to Colombia
 Lippia salicifolia, a plant species endemic to Ecuador

See also
 Salicifolia (disambiguation)